The following is a list of notable people associated with Western Illinois University, located in the American city of Macomb, Illinois.

Notable alumni

Politicians and government officials

Federal government
 Darwin Gale Schisler, Democratic member of the United States House of Representatives for Illinois's 19th congressional district from 1965 to 1967. He earned his B.A. at Western Illinois University.
 Vincent R. Stewart, LtGen US Marine Corps and 20th Director of the Defense Intelligence Agency.
 Tim Walberg, Republican member of the United States House of Representatives for Michigan's 7th congressional district since 2011. He attended Western Illinois University, but earned his B.A. at Taylor University.
 Harlan Watson, Special Envoy to the United Nations Framework Convention on Climate Change.

State legislators
 Tod Bowman, Democratic member of the Iowa Senate for District 29. He earned his M.Ed. at the university.
 Rich Brauer, Republican member of the Illinois House of Representatives for the 87th district (2003–2015). He attended Western, but did not graduate.
 Kathie Conway, Republican member of the Missouri House of Representatives representing the 104th district since 2011. She graduated with a B.S. in Law Enforcement Administration.
 Kirk Dillard, Republican member of the Illinois Senate (1994–2014) and gubernatorial candidate in 2010 and 2014.
 Randy Frese, Republican member of the Illinois House of Representatives representing the 94th district (2015–present). He earned B.S. in agriculture from Western.
 Regis Groff, Democratic member of the Colorado Senate from the 33rd district (1974–1994). He was the second African-American elected to the Colorado Senate.
 Norine Hammond, Republican member of the Illinois House of Representatives (2010–present). Her district, the 93rd, includes the university's Macomb campus.
 Joe Hutter, Republican member of the Iowa House of Representatives from 2003 to 2007. He earned his B.A. from Western.
 Kimberly Lightford, Assistant Majority Leader in the Illinois Senate. She has represented the 4th district since 1998. She earned a B.A. in communications at Western.
 Mona Martin, Republican member of the Iowa House of Representatives for the 43rd district (1993-2001). She earned her B.S. from Western.
 Jerry L. Mitchell, Republican member of the Illinois House of Representatives (1995–2012). He represented the 90th district and earned his Ed.S. at Western Illinois University.
 John Millner, Republican member of the Illinois Senate representing the 28th district (2005–2013). Earned his master's degree in criminal justice administration at the university.
 Richard P. Myers, Republican member of the Illinois House of Representatives (1995–2010. He earned his B.S. at the university.
 Cynthia Nava, Democratic member of the New Mexico Senate from 1992 to 2012.
 Timothy H. Osmond, Republican member of the Illinois House of Representatives from the 61st district (1999–2002).
 James O'Toole, Democratic member of the Missouri House of Representatives from 1992 to 2002. He attended Western Illinois University, but graduated from University of Missouri at St. Louis.
 Todd Sieben Republican member of the Illinois Senate (1993–2008). He earned his B.S. in business administration at Western.
 Mike Smiddy, Democratic member of the Illinois House of Representatives from the 71st district (2013–present). He attended Western Illinois University.
 Litesa Wallace, Democratic member of the Illinois House of Representatives from the 67th district (2014–present). She earned her B.A. and M.Ed. from Western.
 Frank B. Wood, Democratic member of the Iowa Senate from the 42nd district.

Local officeholders
 Matthew Shirk, Public Defender of Florida's Fourth Judicial Circuit Court (2008–16). He earned his B.S. at the university in 1997.

Activists
 Mary Matalin, Republican political strategist who worked on the campaigns of Dave O'Neal, George H. W. Bush and served as chief of staff to Lee Atwater.
Erin Merryn, activist behind Erin’s Law, a law requiring kids be taught personal body safety education, which has been passed in 37 states.
 Caryl M. Stern, president and CEO of the U.S. Fund for UNICEF. She is a human rights advocate who has worked for the Anti-Defamation League. She earned her M.S. at Western.
 C. T. Vivian, leader in the Civil Rights Movement who participated in the Freedom Rides.

International figures
 Ahmet Kenan Tanrıkulu – Turkish politician
 Camilo Osías Filipino politician

Business
 Robert Nardelli – former chairman and chief executive officer of Chrysler, former president and CEO of Home Depot
 Jeremy Schoemaker – internet entrepreneur

Media and arts
 Michael Boatman – actor and author
 Mark Konkol – 2011 Pulitzer Prize–winning journalist (Chicago Sun-Times)
 John Mahoney – actor, Frasier, taught at Western
 Jason Tanamor - writer and author

Education
 David L. Chicoine, 19th president of South Dakota State University (2007–present). He earned his M.A. at Western Illinois University.
 Bob Krause, vice president for Institutional Advancement at Kansas State University (1986–2009). He served as acting Athletic Director from 2008 to 2009.
 Michael Shonrock, 22nd president of Lindenwood University.
 Paul Vallas, education administrator who has served as the chief executive for Chicago Public Schools (1995–2001), School District of Philadelphia (2002–2006) and the Recovery School District of Louisiana (2007–2012).
 Syed Abul Kalam Azad, treasurer of University of Dhaka

Athletes and coaches
 Khalen Saunders – Super Bowl champion (LIV) - National Football League
 Don Beebe – National Football League
 David Bowens – National Football League
 Fabien Bownes – National Football League
 Lee Calhoun – Olympic gold medal winner
 Bryan Cox – National Football League
 Booker Edgerson – National Football League
 Larry Garron – National Football League
 Don Greco – National Football League
 Rodney Harrison – National Football League
 Edgerton Hartwell – National Football League
 Frisman Jackson – National Football League
 William James – National Football League
 Kosuke Kimura – soccer midfielder for the Colorado Rapids of Major League Soccer
 Gary Lagesse – Hall of Fame Softball Coach 
 Gene Lamont – Major League Baseball
 Rob Lazeo – Canadian Football League
 Lamar McGriggs – National Football League
 Russ Michna – Arena Football League
 Red Miller – former head coach of the NFL Denver Broncos and USFL Denver Gold
 Dennis Morgan – National Football League
 J. R. Niklos – National Football League
 Terell Parks (born 1991) - basketball player in the Israeli Basketball Premier League
 Paul Reuschel – Major League Baseball & National Football League
 Rick Reuschel – Major League Baseball
 Mike Scifres – National Football League
 Rich Seubert – National Football League
 Rick Short – Major League Baseball
 Tom Soehn – director of soccer operations for Vancouver Whitecaps FC
 Aaron Stecker – National Football League
 John Teerlinck – National Football League
 Marco Thomas – Canadian Football League
 Mike Wagner – National Football League
 Jason Williams – National Football League
 Frank Winters – National Football league

References

External links
  – Western Illinois University

Lists of people by university or college in Illinois